Melrose is an unincorporated community and census-designated place in Douglas County, Oregon, United States. As of the 2010 census, it had a population of 735. It was named by Henry Scott for Melrose Abbey in Scotland. Its post office, at first named Hogan, was established on May 18, 1887, and James McKinney was the first postmaster. Named earlier on as French Settlement, Oregon.

Demographics

References

Unincorporated communities in Douglas County, Oregon
Census-designated places in Oregon
1887 establishments in Oregon
Populated places established in 1887
Census-designated places in Douglas County, Oregon
Unincorporated communities in Oregon